Field Barn Heaths, Hilborough is a  biological Site of Special Scientific Interest north-west of Hilborough in Norfolk. It is part of the Breckland Special Area of Conservation and Special Protection Area.

This light sandy grassland site is maintained by rabbit grazing and it has a rich variety of flora. There are also areas of ungrazed grassland and oak and hawthorn woodland.

The site is private land with no public access.

References

Sites of Special Scientific Interest in Norfolk
Hilborough